Solfrid Koanda (born 13 November 1998) is a Norwegian weightlifter. She won the gold medal in the women's 87kg event at the 2022 World Weightlifting Championships held in Bogotá, Colombia. She also won the gold medal in her event at the 2022 European Weightlifting Championships held in Tirana, Albania.

In 2021, she won the bronze medal in the women's 87kg event at the World Weightlifting Championships held in Tashkent, Uzbekistan.

Career 
In April 2021, Koanda won bronze in the clean and jerk during the European Weightlifting Championships, with a new Nordic record of 135 kg.

Koanda has been strength training in the gym since she was 15 years old. She trained crossfit at the age of 18 and started weightlifting at age 21. Her development was sensational and in February 2021 she qualified for the European Championships and set the Norwegian record 96 kg in the snatch and 125 kg in clean and jerk in a competition in Lillesand.

At the 2021 European Junior & U23 Weightlifting Championships in Rovaniemi, Finland, she won the gold medal in her event.

Personal life 
Koanda is 1 meter and 66 centimeters tall and works as an electrician.

She lives in Arendal, Norway and represents Kvadraturen Weightlifting Club.

Achievements

References

External links 
 

1998 births
Living people
Norwegian female weightlifters
World Weightlifting Championships medalists
European Weightlifting Championships medalists
21st-century Norwegian women